The name Bob was used for three tropical cyclones in the Atlantic basin. The name Bob was retired in the spring of 1992, and was replaced by Bill in the 1997 season.

 Hurricane Bob (1979), hit Louisiana, killing one and causing $20 million in damage; the first hurricane in the Atlantic to have a male name
 Hurricane Bob (1985), crossed Florida as a tropical storm and made landfall again in South Carolina; caused 5 deaths and $20 million in damage
 Hurricane Bob (1991), brushed North Carolina, then struck New England and the Canadian Maritimes, killing 18 and causing almost $1½ billion in damage (other reports indicate Bob did near $3 billion in damage)

Atlantic hurricane set index articles